Natalie Wilson (born September 23, 1971 as Natalie Simmons), is an American gospel musician and artist. She started her music career, in 2000, with the release of Girl Director by Interscope Records. This would be her Billboard magazine breakthrough release upon the Gospel Albums and the R&B Albums charts. Her second album, Good Life, was released in 2003 by GospoCentric. The album would chart again on the two aforementioned charts.

Early life
Wilson was born on September 23, 1971, in Newark, New Jersey, the daughter of Bishop Nathaniel Simmons and Johnnie Mae Simmons Bishop Simmons started Sounds of Praise Pentecostal Fellowship Ministries, Inc., and was the pastor of St. Paul's Church, yet he died in 1999. Her brother, Glenn, was supposed to take over the helm of the choir, but he died in 1992. Her father asked her to take over and lead the church's choir, which she did, instead of pursuing an occupation in the cosmetology field. She has another brother, Bishop Wayne Andre', and two sisters, Stacey and Takesha.

Music career
Her music career started in 2000, with the release of Girl Director by Interscope Records on October 3, 2000. This was her breakthrough release on the Billboard magazine, and the charts it placed on was Gospel Albums at No. 8, No. 50 on the R&B Albums chart, the Heatseekers Albums at No. 39, and at No. 22 upon the Christian Albums chart. She released, Good Life, on October 7, 2003, and this was with GospoCentric Records. The album placed on the Billboard magazine charts again, this time it peaked at No. 12 upon the Gospel Albums and R&B Albums at No. 83. Cross Rhythms magazine rated both of the album, and the first received a nine out of ten, while the second received only a five out of ten review.

Personal life
Wilson is married to Joseph "Joe" Wilson. Wilson is also the maternal aunt of Latrelle.

Discography

Studio albums

References

External links
 ChristianMusic.com Profile
 New York Gospel Interview

1971 births
Living people
African-American songwriters
African-American Christians
Musicians from Newark, New Jersey
Songwriters from New Jersey
Interscope Records artists
Songwriters from New York (state)
21st-century African-American people
20th-century African-American people